Mudge is a surname. Notable people with the surname include:

Politics 
 Dirk Mudge (1928–2020), Namibian politician
 Geoffrey Mudge, English politician

Religion 
 Enoch Mudge (1776–1850), first Methodist minister reared in New England
 James Mudge (1844–1918), American Methodist Episcopal clergyman and writer
 Richard Mudge (1718–1763), English clergyman and composer
 Thomas H. Mudge (1815–1862), American Methodist Episcopal clergyman
 Zachariah Mudge (priest) (1694–1769), British clergyman
 Zachariah A. Mudge (1813–1888), American Methodist Episcopal clergyman

Sports 
 Angela Mudge (born 1970), British hill runner
 Dave Mudge (born 1974), Canadian football offensive lineman
 Katherine Mudge (1881–1975), British archer at the 1908 Olympic Games

Other 
 Benjamin Franklin Mudge (1817–1879), American lawyer, geologist and teacher
 John Mudge (1721–1793), English physician and recipient of the Copley Medal
 Thomas Mudge (horologist) (1715–1794), British horologist
 William Mudge (1762–1820), English artillery officer and surveyor
 Zachary Mudge (1770–1852), Officer in the British Royal Navy who served in the Vancouver Expedition

See also 
 
 Peiter Zatko (born 1970), known by his pseudonym "Mudge", hacker and computer security advisor
 Mudge Rose Guthrie Alexander & Ferdon, a now-defunct law firm which was based in New York City
 Mudge the Otter, an anthropomorphic otter in the Spellsinger series of fantasy novels
 The Mudge Boy, a 2003 American movie
 Cape Mudge band, one of the two main peoples of the Laich-kwil-tach
 Mudgie´s Deli, a restaurant in Corktown owned by Greg Mudge